A Bird Flies Out is the fourth album by singer-songwriter Deb Talan, released April 6, 2004, on her independent label.

Track listing

References

2004 albums